Willie Roberts (born March 8, 1931) is a former Canadian football player who played for the Calgary Stampeders. He played college football at the University of Tulsa.

References

Living people
1931 births
Players of American football from Oklahoma
American football ends
Canadian football ends
American players of Canadian football
Tulsa Golden Hurricane football players
Calgary Stampeders players
People from Chickasha, Oklahoma